The following lists events that happened during 2013 in Laos.

Incumbents
Party General Secretary: Choummaly Sayasone
President: Choummaly Sayasone
Vice President:  Bounnhang Vorachith
Prime Minister: Thongsing Thammavong

Events
16 October - Lao Airlines Flight 301 crashes, killing all 49 on board.

References

 
Years of the 21st century in Laos
Laos
2010s in Laos
Laos